Truist may refer to:

 Truist Field, a baseball stadium in Charlotte, North Carolina
 Truist Field at Wake Forest, a football stadium in Winston-Salem, North Carolina
 Truist Financial, an American bank holding company headquartered in Charlotte, North Carolina
 Truist Park, a baseball stadium in Cumberland, Georgia, in the Atlanta metropolitan area
 Truist Point, a baseball stadium in High Point, North Carolina 
 Truist Stadium, a baseball stadium in Winston-Salem, North Carolina
 Truist Stadium (North Carolina A&T), a football stadium in Greensboro, North Carolina